Jane Melville Wernick CBE FREng (born April 1954) is a British structural engineer and a director of engineersHRW. Having founded Jane Wernick Associates in 1998, she gave the firm to an employee trust in 2010 and it was incorporated into engineersHRW in May 2015. Previously she worked at Arup (1976–1998). During her career with Arup, and later with Jane Wernick Associates, she was closely involved with projects including Stansted Airport terminal building and the London Eye.

Early life and interests 
Wernick was born in 1954, the eldest child of Irving and Doreen Wernick, and has lived in Hampstead, London. She attended Haberdashers' Aske's School for Girls in Acton and graduated from the University of Southampton in 1976.

Career 
From 1976 to 1998, Wernick worked for Ove Arup & Partners. She was in charge of Arup's Los Angeles office from 1986 to 1988. Wernick was the RAEng Visiting Professor of Design at Southampton University and has taught at the Harvard Graduate School of Design, the Mackintosh School of Architecture, Glasgow, and the Architectural Association, London. Wernick has been a member of the EDGE think tank and the RIBA Building Futures Steering Committee, in addition to a member of the Design Council CABE Design Review Panel and has been the Chair of the Diversity Task Force of the Construction Industry Council.

From 1996 to 1999 Wernick was a member of the Council of the Institution of Structural Engineers. She was also on the CABE Design Review Panel from 2001 to 2006 and the CABE Schools Panel from 2007 to 2011.

in 2016 Wernick and her work were featured in the V&A's Engineering Season.

Notable projects 
 1986: Cerritos Centre for the Performing Arts, Los Angeles 
 1990–1993: Lille TGV station
 1990–1998: London Eye
 2004–2006:  Young Vic, London
 2005: Tickle Cock Bridge, Castleford
 2010–2011 Living Architecture houses, including the Balancing Barn, near Aldeburgh, Suffolk; the Shingle House, Dungeness, Kent; the Long House, Cockthorpe, Norfolk and the Dune House, Thorpeness, Suffolk

Awards 
 1988: First prize in the Institution of Civil Engineers (ICE) Bridge Competition
 2006: Honorary Fellow of the Royal Institute of British Architects
 2009: Fellow of the Royal Academy of Engineering
 2013: First Woman of the Built Environment
 2015 New Year Honours: Commander of the Order of the British Empire (CBE) – For services to Structural and Civil Engineering

External links 
  Interview with Jane Wernick

References 

1954 births
English civil engineers
Alumni of the University of Southampton
Commanders of the Order of the British Empire
Fellows of the Royal Academy of Engineering
Female Fellows of the Royal Academy of Engineering
Living people
Fellows of the Royal Institute of British Architects
21st-century women engineers